Sarah Niles is a British film, television and theatre actress. She has appeared in Mister Eleven  and Beautiful People  (2009), Thorne: Sleepyhead (2010),  Spotless  (2015),  Catastrophe  (2015-2019), Trust Me  (2019), I May Destroy You  and Trying  (2020), Viewpoint  (2021), Riches  and  The Sandman  in 2022. She is most notable for receiving a nomination for the Emmys for her performance as Dr. Sharon Fieldstone in Ted Lasso .

Early life
Niles was born in Thornton Heath, south London, and was the youngest daughter of three to her father an electrician, and her mother a care nurse, both Barbadian arriving to Britain in the late 1950s. She was a drama student at the Manchester School of Theatre, part of the Manchester Metropolitan University.

Career
Niles has appeared mainly in theatre productions including shows at the National Theatre, The Royal Court, The Old Vic and The Bush Theatre. In 2013 and 2014 she worked with the Royal Shakespeare Company as Charmian in Anthony and Cleopatra, performing at Stratford Upon Avon and touring to Miami and The Public Theater New York. In the same year she played Tituba in a sold-out production of The Crucible at the Old Vic, which was streamed to cinemas throughout the UK and internationally. In 2017, she appeared as Carmen in Guillermo Calderón's play B at the Royal Court alongside Paul Kaye, Aimee-Ffion Edwards and Danusia Samal.

On screen Niles is best known for co-starring in the BBC comedy Beautiful People alongside Olivia Colman. She has also had roles in various high-profile comedy television shows, appearing opposite Sharon Horgan and American comedian Rob Delaney  in Catastrophe and Jason Sudeikis in the second season of Ted Lasso, for the latter she won Screen Actors Guild Award for Outstanding Performance by an Ensemble in a Comedy Series along with the cast of the series, and received an Emmy nomination for Outstanding Supporting Actress in a Comedy Series in 2022. She recently appeared in Sarah Gavron's award-winning film Rocks, Michaela Coel's I May Destroy You and Netflix’s The Sandman. Previously, she appeared in Mike Leigh's Happy-Go-Lucky, London Boulevard and Austenland.

Filmography

Film

Television

Awards and nominations

References

External links

Alumni of Manchester Metropolitan University
British film actresses
British television actresses
British stage actresses
Black British actresses
English people of Barbadian descent
English people of Sierra Leonean descent
Living people
20th-century British actresses
21st-century British actresses
Year of birth missing (living people)